Vladislav Poloz (born 6 June 2001) is a Belarusian professional footballer. As of 2021, he plays for Slavia Mozyr.

References

External links 
 
 

2001 births
Living people
People from Mazyr
Sportspeople from Gomel Region
Belarusian footballers
Association football midfielders
FC Slavia Mozyr players